Peter Robinson (credited professionally as The Living Skeleton, was an American sideshow art performer, perhaps best known for his only film appearance in the Tod Browning cult film Freaks, with a lengthy career in the carnival circus circuit at Coney Island and with Ringling Bros.

He worked as a carnival sideshow entertainer, weighing in at 58 pounds. He had a career in that genre in the vein of circus thin man Isaac W. Sprague and Artie Atherton. He married her numerous times for promotional purposes.

He was also purported to be an expert harmonica player.

References

American male actors
People from Chicopee, Massachusetts
Sideshow performers
People from Agawam, Massachusetts